Carlos Remigio Cardoen Cornejo (born 1 May 1942, Santa Cruz, Chile) is a Chilean arms dealer, metallurgical engineer, weapons scientist and agricultural businessman.

Cardoen rose to prominence amidst the United States arms embargo against Chile, when he became in the 1980s "Pinochet's favourite arms manufacturer".

When Saddam Hussein fell out of favor with the United States in connection with the 1990 invasion of Kuwait Cardoen, who had weapon dealings with Iraq, was accused by the US of zirconium trafficking. Since then he has been on the Interpol wanted list. On various occasions Cardoen has received support from National Congress and the Minister of Foreign Affairs to end the Interpol arrest warrant.

Weapons industry

As a weapons expert he ran FAMAE in the late 1980s. He allegedly illegally sold zirconium supplemented armaments to Iraq under the Saddam Regime, exported from the United States, for which he has an international arrest warrant. Yet, Cardoen claims the United States was aware and implicitly consented this trade until Saddam Hussein fell out of favour.

During the height of the Beagle crisis in 1978 Cardoen was contacted by Chilean Air Force commander Fernando Matthei and designed on his request a light bomb, that could be dropped from any airforce plane, in only 15 days. When asking Matthei what did he want the bomb for, he reportedly answered: ''"para joder"' (to joke around)'.

In the mid-1980 Cardoen bought the Italian swimmer delivery vehicle and minisub manufacturer Cos.Mo.S. His attempts to sell the firm under the table to Iraq ended in scandal and the closure of the company. A warrant was issued for his arrest, but he was never brought to justice.

Cardoen claims Iraq owes him US$50 million from weapon purchases.

Agriculture and tourism
From the 1990s onwards Cardoen has invested capital into the wine, energy, match, fruit juice and tourism businesses in Chile, especially in O'Higgins, his home region. Due to his involvement in cultural and tourism projects he has been awarded the "Premio a lo Chileno" in 2006 and "Orden al Mérito Docente y Cultural Gabriela Mistral" in 2005. He has been suffering from colon cancer for many years.

See also
Iran-Contra
Fábricas y Maestranzas del Ejército de Chile

References

External links

Museo de Colchagua official website

The Chilean Connection
Sumario del Caso Cardoen
Cardoen Industries
"Scoop: Ecco come il Sismi doveva rapire Carlos Remigio Cardoen" ("Scoop: Here's how The Sismi was to kidnap Carlos Remigio Cardoen") 

1942 births
20th-century Chilean businesspeople
20th-century Chilean engineers
Cos.Mo.S
Fugitives
Instituto Regional Federico Errázuriz alumni
Chilean people of Belgian descent
Living people
People from Santa Cruz, Chile
Weapons scientists and engineers
Arms traders